The 1940 Cambridge University by-election was a parliamentary by-election for the British House of Commons constituency of Cambridge University on 23 February 1940. Cambridge University was a two-member constituency.

Vacancy
The by-election was caused by the death of the sitting Conservative MP, Sir John James Withers on 29 December 1939 at the age of 76. He had been one of the MPs here since holding the seat in the 1926 Cambridge University by-election.

Election history
In the 1935 general election it elected two Conservative MPs. 
Cambridge University had been won by Conservatives at every election since 1922 when an Independent Liberal won one of the seats. The result at the last General election was as follows;

Candidates
Due to the wartime electoral truce, the party who were defending the seat were assured of not facing an official candidate from the other political parties. However, the Conservative party, who were defending the seat, did not put forward an official candidate.

In 1939, before Withers had died, his health was not good and it was expected that a by-election would need to take place. The Master of Magdalene College, Allen Beville Ramsay had obtained agreement that none of the major parties would field a candidate if prominent economist, John Maynard Keynes chose to stand. Keynes was a Liberal party member and so unlikely to win the seat if a Conservative was standing. Keynes declined the invitation as he felt he would wield greater influence on events if he remained a free agent.

Eventually, Keynes brother in law, 54-year-old Prof. Archibald Hill became a candidate, standing as an Independent Conservative. He was professor of physiology at University College, London. In 1933, he became a founder member and vice-president of the Academic Assistance Council (which became the Society for the Protection of Science and Learning in 1936). By the start of the Second World War, the organisation had saved 900 academics from the Nazi persecution.

Fifty-one-year-old Prof. John Ryle came forward to stand as an Independent Progressive. He was appointed in 1935 Regius Professor of Physic at the University of Cambridge. Ryle was politically active at Cambridge, helping Jewish scholars emigrate from Germany and Austria before World War II. During the early stages of the war, he was working at Guy's Hospital to help them prepare for the Blitz.

Result
Polling took place over four days from 19 to 23 February. 
Hill took the seat from the Conservatives as an Independent Conservative

Aftermath
Hill did not contest 1945 general election, in which the two seats were won by one Conservative and one Independent;

References

See also
 List of United Kingdom by-elections
 United Kingdom by-election records
 

Cambridge University by-election
Cambridge University by-election
20th century in Cambridge
Cambridge University by-election
By-elections to the Parliament of the United Kingdom in Cambridge University